The Burgess HT-2 Speed Scout was an experimental United States observation/fighter seaplane.

Development and design
The Speed Scout's airframe was made of wood with a fabric covering, except for the engine cowling which was aluminum. The aircraft was powered by a Curtiss OXX-2 engine. Despite being underpowered, 8 were purchased by the US Navy in 1917 following demonstration flights on 19 May 1917.

Specifications

References

Bibliography
 

1910s United States military reconnaissance aircraft
Floatplanes
Single-engined tractor aircraft
Biplanes
HT2
Aircraft first flown in 1917